Bagh-e Esfahanuiyeh (also Romanized as Bāgh-e Eṣfahānū’īyeh; also known as Eṣfehānūueeyeh) is a village in Golzar Rural District, in the Central District of Bardsir County, Kerman Province, Iran. At the 2006 census, its population was 110, in 21 families.

References 

Populated places in Bardsir County